B roads are numbered routes in Great Britain of lesser importance than A roads. See the article Great Britain road numbering scheme for the rationale behind the numbers allocated.

B300 to B399

B3000 to B3099

B3100 to B3199
.

B3200 to B3299

B3300 to B3399

B3400 to B3499

Footnotes

References

3
 3